{{Infobox automobile
| image        = Fiat_125_Special_1971_%2818869446682%29.jpg
| caption     = 1971 Fiat 125 Special
| name         = Fiat 125
| manufacturer = Fiat
| production   = 1967–1972
| assembly     =  Turin, ItalyCasablanca, Morocco (SOMACA)Córdoba, Argentina (until 1982) Rancagua, ChileJakarta, Indonesia (until 1986)
| predecessor  = Fiat 1500
| successor    = Fiat 132
| class        = Large family car (D)
| platform     = 
| body_style   = 4-door Sedan5-door Estate car
| engine       = 1608 cc DOHC
| transmission = 4-speed manual (125: 1967–1973)5-speed manual (125S: 1968–1970, 125 Special 1970–1973)3-speed automatic (125S: 1968–1970, 125 Special 1970–1973)
| wheelbase    = 
| length       = 
| width        = 
| height       = 
| weight       = 
| aka          = 
| related      = Fiat 1300/1500Fiat 124Zastava 125pzZhiguli_(car_brand)Polski Fiat 125pFSO Polonez
| designer     = 
}}

The Fiat 125 is a large family car manufactured and marketed by Italian company Fiat from 1967 to 1972. Derivatives were built under license outside Italy until the 1990s. As launched the car was unusual in blending saloon car passenger accommodation with sports car performance, a combination which would be more widely adopted by the European volume auto-makers in the decade ahead.

The body
The floor pan was virtually unchanged from that of the longer variant of the outgoing model, the Fiat 1300/1500, and the chassis used was the same as the Fiat 1300/1500.  The body was a slightly lengthened development of the Fiat 124: both models shared the same passenger compartment and doors, but the 125's rear seat was set slightly further back, reflecting the 2505 mm wheel-base, inherited from the Fiat 1500 and over 8 cm (3 inches) longer than that of the 124.

Engine and running gear
The new car's engine was based on the one fitted in the Fiat 124 Sport: a 1608 cc DOHC unit with 90 bhp driving the rear wheels. The 125 was equipped with a Weber 34 DCHE 20 or Solex 34 PIA carburettor.  The car was fitted with an alternator, reflecting the twin headlights and the increasing number of energy intensive electrical components appearing on cars at this time.   Other noteworthy features included the electromagnetic cooling fan clutch.

Developments
The 125 featured one of the world's first intermittent wipers and was praised when new for its handling and dynamics. British Autocar found the slight understeer tendencies were easily cured by adjusting the front camber.

In 1968 the 125S ("Special") was added to the range, with 100 bhp (from a modified cylinder head, camshafts, inlet/outlet manifold and Weber/Solex carburettor) and, unusually at this time, a five-speed gearbox.  It also had halogen lights, servo-assisted twin circuit brakes and optional superlight magnesium wheels.
A variety of other improvements were made including improved cabin ventilation, trim and styling.

The Special was facelifted in 1971 using pretty much the same trim as the 125S, but both front and rear lights were new and wider, enhancing the visual width of the car. 
The interior gained upgraded upholstery of the seats and a wood facia. A three-speed automatic transmission as well as air conditioning became available as an option.

Variations
A variant, the 125 T, was made by the Fiat importers in New Zealand, Torino Motors, for the annual 6 hour production car race, the Benson and Hedges 500. All featured Ward alloy wheels and were painted bright yellow. Sources for production figures quote that between 84 and 89 were modified. Reasons for stopping production are  sometimes given that Fiat headquarters found out and stopped this venture. However a more likely scenario is that selling the required 200 cars in a market that only sold 1,000 Fiats in total each year was a tall order.

Other versions were built by Moretti, who made the 125GS 1.6 with styling similar to the Fiat Dino Spider. Zagato made the 125Z; Savio, a 125 Coupé and 125 Station Wagon; Bertone, a 125 Executive; and Vignale produced the Samantha, a two-door coupé with pop-up headlights, designed by Virginio Vairo.

Production

Production by Fiat in Italy ceased in 1972 when the Fiat 132 was introduced. A total of 603,877 cars having been built.

Foreign production

Poland

A licence copy was also produced in Poland by the Fabryka Samochodów Osobowych (FSO) from 1967 until 1991, under the brand Polski Fiat as the Polski Fiat 125p, and later as the FSO 1500, FSO 1300, or FSO 125p.

It was a somewhat simplified variation of the Fiat car, with outdated 1300 cc or 1500 cc engines and mechanicals from the Fiat 1300/1500. Polish cars differed in details from Italian ones, most visible were four round headlights instead of square ones, simpler bumpers and front grill, orange front turn signal lenses, different shape details in tail and front lamps design, simpler body sheet metal stampings, old Fiat 1300/1500 chassis and interior. This model was also available as an estate (the Polski Fiat 125p Kombi'') and a pickup developed in Poland after Italian Fiat 125 production ended in 1972.

Yugoslavia/Serbia
The Zastava 125 was a Zastava produced model identical to the Polish 125p. Available versions were called 125 PZ with 1,295 or 1,481 cc engines.

Egypt

In Egypt production of the Polish 125p version went on under the name Nasr 125 until 1983.

Argentina

In Argentina the 125 was built from 1972 to 1982, initially by Fiat-Concord and later Sevel. In addition to the 4-door sedan version, a station wagon (called "Familiar"), a pickup (called "Multicarga", a unique Argentine design) were built. There was also a coupe called 125 Sport with the same mechanics than the sedan, but based on the Fiat Coupé 1500 Vignale.

Colombia
A few copies were made of Italian 125 and was quickly replaced by Polish 125p better suited to the local market.

Chile
A car that was manufactured almost equal to the Fiat 125 Special restyling in march of 1970.

Morocco
SOMACA (Société Marocaine de Construction Automobile) assembled 125 in Casablanca.

References

125
Sedans
Station wagons
Coupés
Cars introduced in 1967
1970s cars
1980s cars